The R class of the Swedish State Railways (SJ) was a type of steam locomotive built between 1908 and 1909. The class was built primarily to pull heavy iron ore trains on the Iron Ore Line in northern Sweden.

History
As the iron ore trains became heavier in the early 1900s, it became obvious to the Swedish State Railways that their M class of locomotives could not pull the heavier trains without the help of a pusher engine. SJ then placed an order of five locomotives with a 0-10-0 configuration. The class was at its introduction in 1908 the most powerful steam locomotive built in Sweden, a record which lasted until 1930 when the M3t class was introduced. In 1914 the electrification of the Iron Ore Line had begun, thus making the R class unnecessary at the Iron Ore line and the locomotives where transferred south to be used in regular freight trains. In 1935 two locomotives where sold to the private railway Gävle-Dala Järnväg. In 1963 one locomotive (R 975) was sent to Denmark as a part of a deal to bring the F1200 locomotive of the F class. R975 was subsequently scrapped in Denmark in 1963. Of the remaining 4 locomotives in Sweden, 3 were scrapped in 1973. The last locomotive was preserved and is kept in running order by the Swedish Railway Museum that use the locomotive in heritage trains on special occasions.

Sources

Mer om R-loken på Svenska-lok.se

Steam locomotives of Sweden
Standard gauge locomotives of Sweden
Railway locomotives introduced in 1908
0-10-0 locomotives